Scythris aarviki is a moth of the family Scythrididae. It was described by Bengt Å. Bengtsson in 2014. It is found in Malawi and Tanzania.

References

aarviki
Moths described in 2014